Valencia CF won their first La Liga title since 1970-71 season, in the first campaign of new trainer Rafael Benítez. The Tenerife recruit had a tough start to his job, with several dropped points and a midfield slot in the beginning of the season, culminating in a disqualification from Copa del Rey for fielding too many non-EU players. Benítez was reported to be near the sack before an away game against Espanyol. With Valencia trailing 2-0 at halftime, the resurgence of the team in the second half allowed the inexperienced coach to keep the job, and it got to be a starting point for a winning streak that eventually saw Valencia claiming the entire league, despite taking only 75 points and scoring a mere 51 goals.

With the attacking play not flowing as previously, the all-conquering defence improved further, conceding only 29 goals, much thanks to keeper Santiago Cañizares and centre halves Mauricio Pellegrino and Roberto Ayala. Defensively minded midfielder Rubén Baraja happened to be the club top scorer with a mere seven goals, forming an effective protecting block with David Albelda.

Squad

Transfers

Competitions

La Liga

League table

Results by round

Matches

UEFA Cup

Quarter-finals

Statistics

Players statistics

Topscorers
  Rubén Baraja 7
  Salva 5
  Francisco Rufete 5
  Angulo 4
  Pablo Aimar 4
  Mista 4

References 

Valencia CF seasons
Valencia
2001–02